These are the official results of the Women's Javelin Throw at the 1996 Summer Olympics in Atlanta, Georgia.

Medalists

Abbreviations

Records

Qualification

Group A

Group B

Final

See also
1995 World Championships in Athletics – Women's javelin throw
1997 World Championships in Athletics – Women's javelin throw

References

External links
 Official Report
 Results

J
Javelin throw at the Olympics
1996 in women's athletics
Women's events at the 1996 Summer Olympics